Mucha (Czech and Slovak feminine: Muchová) is a Slavic surname, derived from mucha, meaning "fly". Mucha is the standard form for males in the Czech Republic and Slovakia, and for people of both genders in Poland. In other Slavic countries, the surname may appear as Mukha or Muha. 

Mucha may refer to:

Alphonse Mucha (1860–1939), Czech painter
Anna Mucha (born 1980), Polish actress 
Barb Mucha (born 1961), American golfer
Fred Mucha (1999–present), Kenyan academician
Geraldine Mucha (1917–2012), British composer
Ján Mucha (born 1982), Slovak footballer
Ján Mucha (footballer, born 1978), Slovak footballer
Ján Mucha (ice hockey) (born 1984), Slovak ice hockey player
Jan Mucha (speedway rider) (1941–2014), Polish motorcyclist
Jaroslava Muchová (1909–1986), Czech painter
Jiří Mucha (1915–1991), Czech writer
Joanna Mucha (born 1976), Polish politician
Josef Mucha (born 1967), Czech footballer
Karolína Muchová (born 1996), Czech tennis player, daughter of Josef Mucha
Kurtis Mucha (born 1989), Canadian ice hockey player
Olive Mucha (1915–2006), American swimmer
Robert Mucha (1890–1959), American boxer
Rudy Mucha (1918–1982), American football player
Viktor Mucha (1877–1919), Austrian doctor

See also
 
IS-2 Mucha, a single-seat training glider
SZD-22 Mucha Standard, a single-seat glider
Mucha (fly) a genus of flies in the family Sepsidae

References 

West Slavic-language surnames
Czech-language surnames
Polish-language surnames